"Freisinn" (free spirit, free mind) is a poem written by Johann Wolfgang von Goethe in 1815, first published in West–östlicher Divan in 1819.

Composition 

The first verse is inspired by the dictum of a free-spirited Ghalghaï (Ingush) highlander, who, by the account of Moritz von Engelhardt in 1811, rejected an offer to gain benefits under the condition of submitting to the rule of the Tsar, with a short phrase: "Above my hat are only the stars". The second verse is derived from a passage from the Quran.

Publications 
The first German researcher to reveal the connection between the Ingush man's phrase and the poem was Christian Friedrich Wurm in his Commentary on Göthe's West-Eastern Diwan. This would later on be confirmed in the works of Joseph Kürschner, Dieter Borchmeyer. and Martin Mosebach.

The following excerpt was published in the Neue Speyerer Zeitung on 11 July 1820:A free Ingush in the Caucasus, who was told of the benefits he could receive if he went under the rule of the Russian Tsar, encouraged by his independence, proudly, boldly, and truly, replied:  Neither Pope Gregory VII at Canossa, nor the Emperor Napoleon at Jena, could say so surely. Although their hats are bigger than that of the Ingush; but their hearts – not likely.

Music 

On the eve of his wedding in 1840, Robert Schumann presented his wife-to-be Clara with a deluxe edition of Myrthen, a newly composed cycle of 26 songs adorned on the cover with green myrtles, the German symbol of marriage, with "Freisinn" listed as the second composition in this series.

References 

Poetry by Johann Wolfgang von Goethe
1815 poems
History of Ingushetia